Ardisia marcellanum is a species of plant in the family Primulaceae. It is endemic to Cameroon.  Its natural habitat is subtropical or tropical dry forests. It is threatened by habitat loss.

References

Flora of Cameroon
oligantha
Critically endangered plants
Taxonomy articles created by Polbot
Taxobox binomials not recognized by IUCN